Max Trepp (30 June 1924 – 1 January 1990) was a Swiss sprinter. He competed in the men's 400 metres at the 1948 Summer Olympics.

References

External links
 

1924 births
1990 deaths
Athletes (track and field) at the 1948 Summer Olympics
Swiss male sprinters
Olympic athletes of Switzerland